Nuestra Belleza Zacatecas 2011, was held in the Centro Platero of Guadalupe, Zacatecas on June 24, 2011. At the conclusion of the final night of competition Stephanie Ávila crowned her successor. Eight contestants competed for the title.

Results

Placements

Contestants

References

External links
Official Website

Nuestra Belleza México